The UR Experience was the fifth concert tour by American artist Usher. Visiting North America and Europe, the tour played over 40 concerts in 2014 and 2015.

Background

The tour was announced on September 2, 2014.

"With 'The UR Experience', I want to give my fans an ever-changing live show full of surprises and special guests", says Usher. "I am really excited to be with my fans and give them an Usher experience like they've never seen or heard before."

To promote the tour, Raymond released a 30-second black and white video of him training, dancing and preparing for the upcoming tour.

Prior to the tour Usher began working with fashion designer Kerby Jean-Raymond For the tour, they created a custom Pyer Moss bike jacket that he wore over a mess shirt with black cargo pants. Completing the outfit he wore Martin Margiela chain embellished red suede sneakers.

The November 30, 2014 concert, held at Rexall Place in Edmonton, Alberta, Canada; was livestreamed via Yahoo Live!.

Critical reception
The tour was met with positive reviews.

Jon Paroles from The New York Times wrote: "He has established himself as one of R&B's supreme performers and craftsmen, following through on what he learned from Michael Jackson in particular."

Ashley Lee of The Hollywood Reporter wrote:  "His routines were sharp, effortless and even playful at times, and he didn't need to rely on constant gyrating to entertain. Usher also shined vocally when he took the time to do so: bouncing his gold mic stand during 'Caught Up', hitting the top of his range on 'Climax', adding extra runs to 'U Remind Me', impressively closing 'Burn' a cappella."

Robbyn Mitchell of the Tampa Bay Times wrote: "Usher reminded fans constantly that they've been supporting him for 20 years in the music industry -- an unfathomable stat whenever he paused to smile his charming schoolboy girl".

A.R. Shaw from Rolling Out commented: "With new age R&B acts such Chris Brown and Justin Bieber building their presence in music, some may forget Usher's overall impact on the genre. But the 'UR Experience Tour' proves, again, that Usher's legendary status remains intact.".

Gerrick D. Kennedy of the Los Angeles Times wrote: "An Usher show has long been an exhilarating affair packed with high-octane choreography held together by sleek, masterful showmanship."

François Marchand of The Vancouver Sun states, "Usher can embody the cybernetic physicality of a MJ and the pure funk swagger of a JB (as on party jam Twisted — 'Hit me one more time!'), and you can applaud an artist who doesn't rely so much on tape playback and shows just how much blood and sweat he leaves out there on the stage."

David Smyth from the London Evening Standard gave the performance in London 4 out of 5 stars. He said: "Usher himself was quite the mover and shaker, invoking his idol Michael Jackson as he slid and shimmied about the stage in gold trainers. During one triumphant spell, including 'Twisted' and 'Caught Up', his band became an old-style soul revue, horns blasting while the lights blazed. There were snippets of Stevie Wonder and, more surprisingly, Eric Clapton."

Opening acts
DJ Cassidy 
August Alsina 
Nico & Vinz

Setlist
The following setlist was obtained from the concert held on November 1, 2014; at the Bell Centre in Montreal, Quebec, Canada. It does not present all concerts for the duration of the tour.
"My Way"
"OMG"
"Love in This Club"
"You Make Me Wanna..."
"Video Sequence" 
"Nice & Slow"
"U Remind Me"
"Twisted"
"Caught Up"
"She Came to Give it to You"
"Video Sequence" 
"Climax"
"Seduction"
"That's What It's Made For" 
"Confessions Part I" / "Confessions Part II" 
"Instrumental Sequence"
"Burn"
"There Goes My Baby"
"U Got It Bad"
"Superstar"
"Video Sequence"
"Bad Girl"
"Good Kisser"
"U Don't Have to Call"
"DJ Got Us Fallin' in Love"
"Yeah!"
"Video Sequence"
"Without You"

Tour dates

Box office score data

Personnel
Lead Artist
Lead Vocals/Guitar/Drums/Percussion: Usher Raymond
The Funk Rock Orchestra
Guitar/Keyboards/MD: Natural
Drums/Percussion: Aaron Spears
Percussion/DJ/MPC/Sampling/String Programmer/Hype Man: Iz Avila
Keyboards/Organ/Synthesizer/MD: Buddy Strong 
Keyboards/Keybass/Keytar/MD: Valdez Brantley
Additional Musicians
Bass Guitar/Playback Engineer: Andre "Dre" Bowman (on certain dates)
Horns: Rashawn (Trumpet), Rob (Sax), Sean (Trumpet), and Kevin (Trombone)
Vocalists
Backing vocalists: Kristal Lyndriette, Gene Noble and Neka Brown
Dancers
Choreographer: Jamaica Craft
Dancers: QuitaBee, Eyal Pipo Layani ,Kento Mori, Josh Smith, Jessica Digi (Europe only), Yusuke Nakai, Marc Marvelous, Ashley Everett, Antonio Hudnell and Naeemah McCowan

Notes

References

2014 concert tours
2015 concert tours
Usher (musician) concert tours